The following is a list of notable deaths in January 2009.

Entries for each day are listed alphabetically by surname. A typical entry lists information in the following sequence:
 Name, age, country of citizenship at birth, subsequent country of citizenship (if applicable), reason for notability, cause of death (if known), and reference.

January 2009

1
Todd Bullard, 77, American educator, complications from diabetes.
Dennis Ford, 77, South African Olympic swimmer.
Walter Haynes, 80, American steel guitarist.
John Morrow, 77, British Presbyterian minister and peace activist.
Fahid Mohammed Ally Msalam, 32, Kenyan al-Qaeda leader, allegedly behind Marriott hotel bombings, airstrike.
Claiborne Pell, 90, American Senator from Rhode Island (1961–1997), creator of the Pell Grant, Parkinson's disease.
Gert Petersen, 81, Danish journalist and politician.
Robert Prince, 89, American Major, recipient of the Distinguished Service Cross.
Edmund Purdom, 84, British actor.
Nizar Rayan, 49, Palestinian Hamas military and political leader, airstrike.
Willard Warren Scott, Jr., 82, American general, head of United States Military Academy (1981–1986), Parkinson's disease.
Johannes Mario Simmel, 84, Austrian writer.
Henry King Stanford, 92, American academic, president of the University of Miami (1962–1981).
Helen Suzman, 91, South African anti-apartheid activist and politician, MP (1953–1989).
Sheikh Ahmed Salim Swedan, 48, Kenyan al-Qaeda leader, airstrike.
Robert Saxton Taylor, 90, American library scholar.

2
Dnyaneshwar Agashe, 66, Indian cricketer and businessman, heart attack.
Leonard Andrews, 83, American art patron, prostate cancer.
Inger Christensen, 73, Danish poet, novelist and essayist.
John DeFrancis, 97, American sinologist.
Pavel Deyev, 67, Soviet Olympic equestrian.
Ralph Gibson, 84, American flying ace of the Korean War.
Hank DeZonie, 86, American basketball player.
Steven Gilborn, 72, American actor (Ellen), cancer.
Valentina Giovagnini, 28, Italian singer, car crash.
Ian Greaves, 76, British footballer and manager (Mansfield Town, Bolton Wanderers).
Tony Gregory, 61, Irish politician, member of Dáil Éireann, cancer.
Joe Henry, 78, American baseball player (Memphis Red Sox, Negro leagues).
Ryuzo Hiraki, 77, Japanese footballer, pneumonia.
Albert Horner, 95, Canadian politician, MP for The Battlefords (1958–1968).
John Olav Larssen, 81, Norwegian evangelical preacher.
Rashid bin Ahmad Al Mualla II, 78, Emirati ruler of Umm al-Quwain.
József Sákovics, 81, Hungarian Olympic fencer.
Nick Scandone, 42, American yachtsman, paralympian gold medallist (2008), Lou Gehrig's disease.
Cy Thomas, 82, British ice hockey player.
Olgierd Zienkiewicz, 87, British civil engineer.

3
Abu Zakaria al-Jamal, 49, Palestinian senior Hamas leader, air strike.
Kjelfrid Brusveen, 82, Norwegian cross-country skier.
Charles Camilleri, 77, Maltese composer.
John Grindrod, 89, Australian Anglican prelate, Archbishop of Brisbane (1980–1989).
Peter English, 71, Scottish professor of agriculture and author, heart failure.
Betty Freeman, 87, American philanthropist.
Pat Hingle, 84, American actor (Batman, Norma Rae, Hang 'Em High), myelodysplasia.
Li Zuopeng, 94, Chinese general and politician.
Ulf G. Lindén, 71, Swedish entrepreneur, heart failure.
Sam McQuagg, 73, American race car driver, NASCAR Rookie of the Year (1965), cancer.
Hisayasu Nagata, 39, Japanese politician, suicide by jumping.
Olga San Juan, 81, American actress, kidney failure.
Matt Sczesny, 76, American scout for the Boston Red Sox, cancer.
Sir Alan Walters, 82, British economist.

4
Lei Clijsters, 52, Belgian footballer and coach, father of Kim Clijsters, lung cancer.
Sonny Fai, 20, New Zealand rugby league player, drowned.
Oswaldo Domingues, 91, Brazilian Olympic sprinter.
K. K. Govind, 92, Indian freedom fighter.
Gedalio Grinberg, 77, Cuban-born American founder of Movado Group, natural causes.
Ivan Gubijan, 85, Croatian hammer thrower, Olympic medalist (1948), after long illness.
India, 18, American pet cat of George W. Bush.
Gert Jonke, 62, Austrian writer and poet, cancer.
Arvid Knutsen, 64, Norwegian footballer (Viking FK), brain tumor.
Jon Latimer, 44, British historian, heart attack.
Bob Lazarus, 52, American comedian, leukemia.
Sudhir Ranjan Majumdar, 75, Indian politician, Chief Minister of Tripura (1988–1992), heart attack.
John McGillicuddy, 78, American CEO of Manufacturers Hanover (1971–1991), Chemical Banking (1991–1993), prostate cancer.
Vladimir Repyev, 52, Russian Olympic silver medal-winning (1980) handball player.
Giselle Salandy, 21, Trinidadian boxer, car accident.

5
Griffin Bell, 90, American judge, Fifth Circuit Appeals Court (1961–1976), U.S. Attorney General (1977–1979), pancreatic cancer.
Evangelos Depastas, 76, Greek Olympic runner.
Harry Kinnard, 93, American Army lieutenant general.
Dale Livingston, 63, American football player (Green Bay Packers), complications from heart surgery.
Mario Magnotta, 66, Italian Internet celebrity, pulmonary embolism.
Adolf Merckle, 74, German businessman, suicide by train impact.
Stanton Parris, 78, Barbadian cricket umpire, after short illness.
Roland Piquepaille, 62, French software engineer and technology writer, complications from digestive virus.
Carl Pohlad, 93, American banker, owner of the Minnesota Twins.
Jimmy Rayner, 73, English footballer (Peterborough United).
Verna Mae Slone, 94, American author and quilter, complications from a fall.
Mircea Stănescu, 39, Romanian politician, MP (2004–2008), apparent suicide by gunshot.
Ned Tanen, 77, American executive (Universal Pictures), natural causes.
Sam Taylor, 74, American blues musician, complications from heart disease.

6
Ron Asheton, 60, American rock guitarist (The Stooges), heart attack (death announced on this date).
Nino Bongiovanni, 97, American baseball player.
Brahmkumar Bhatt, 87, Indian politician and Indian independence activist.
Geoffrey Brooke, 88, British Olympic modern pentathlete.
Vivian Della Chiesa, 94, American soprano and Broadway theatre performer.
Robert T. Connor, 90, American politician, Staten Island Borough President (1966–1977).
Maria Dimitriadi, 58, Greek singer, lung disease.
John T. Elfvin, 91, American federal judge, justice of the Western District of New York since 1974.
Alan Geisler, 78, American condiment inventor and food chemist, protein disorder.
Cheryl Holdridge, 64, American actress (The Mickey Mouse Club), lung cancer.
John Riley Holt, 90, British physicist.
Róbert Ilosfalvy, 81, Hungarian opera singer.
Claude Jeter, 94, American gospel music singer.
Frank Richard Maloney, 63, American writer and poet.
John Scott Martin, 83, British actor (Doctor Who, I, Claudius, Z-Cars), Parkinson's disease.
Richard Seaver, 82, American owner of Arcade Publishing, heart attack.
Ghulam Mohammad Shah, 88, Indian politician, Chief Minister of Jammu and Kashmir (1984–1986), after long illness.
John Street, 77, British snooker referee, pulmonary disease.
Victor Sumulong, 62, Filipino politician, Congressman (1998–2007), Mayor of Antipolo since 2007, diabetes.
Charlie Thomson, 78, Scottish footballer (Clyde, Chelsea, Nottingham Forest).

7
Aimé Adam, 95, Canadian politician.
Yaakov Banai, 89, Israeli Lehi commander.
Don Callender, 81, American businessman, founder of Marie Callender's restaurants.
J. D. H. Catleugh, 88, British artist.
Alfie Conn, Sr., 82, Scottish footballer (Hearts, Raith Rovers, Scotland).
Alex van Heerden, 34, South African musician, car accident.
Jacques Littlefield, 59, American owner of the Military Vehicle Technology Foundation, colon cancer.
Robert T. Monagan, 88, American politician, Speaker of the California State Assembly (1969–1970), after long illness.
Puck Oversloot, 94, Dutch swimmer, Olympic silver medallist (1932).
Anália de Victória Pereira, 67, Angolan politician.
Ray Dennis Steckler, 70, American film director (Rat Pfink a Boo Boo), cardiac arrest.
Bob Wilkins, 76, American television personality, horror film host, complications from Alzheimer's disease.

8
Magdaleno Cano, 75, Mexican Olympic cyclist.
Alberto Eliani, 86, Italian football player and manager.
Don Galloway, 71, American actor (Ironside, The Big Chill, Gunfight in Abilene), stroke.
Björn Haugan, 66, Norwegian operatic lyric tenor.
Irène Mélikoff, 91, Russian-born French Turkologist.
Gaston Lenôtre, 88, French pastry chef.
Charles Morgan, Jr., 78, American lawyer, complications of Alzheimer's disease.
Richard John Neuhaus, 72, Canadian-born American Roman Catholic priest and theologian, founder of First Things, cancer.
Zbigniew Podlecki, 68, Polish motorcycle speedway rider.
Deborah Riedel, 50, Australian soprano, cancer.
Leonidas Vargas, 60, Colombian drug trafficker, shot.
Cornelia Wallace, 69, American First Lady of Alabama (1971–1978), second wife of George Wallace, cancer.
Lasantha Wickrematunge, 50, Sri Lankan journalist, shot.

9
István Antal, 50, Romanian Olympic ice hockey player, cardiac arrest.
Dave Dee, 67, British singer (Dave Dee, Dozy, Beaky, Mick & Tich), prostate cancer.
Harry Endo, 87, American actor (Hawaii Five-O), stroke.
Rob Gauntlett, 21, British mountaineer, youngest Briton to climb Mount Everest, climbing accident.
Jon Hager, 67, American country musician and comedian (Hee Haw).
René Herms, 26, German middle-distance runner.
Joe Hirsch, 80, American horse racing journalist, Parkinson's disease.
T. Llew Jones, 93, British Welsh language writer.
Peter Lane, Baron Lane of Horsell, 83, British businessman and politician.
Pál Németh, 71, Hungarian hammer throw coach, heart failure.
Kaarle Ojanen, 90, Finnish chess player.
Dave Roberts, 64, American baseball pitcher, lung cancer.
Jean Sassi, 91, French army colonel.
Jack F. Shaw, 70, American cross country running coach.
David Smiley, 92, British SOE officer.
Ljubica Sokić, 94, Serbian painter.
Tom Van Flandern, 68, American astronomer, colon cancer.
Sir Neil Wheeler, 91, British Air Chief Marshal.
Frank Williams, 50, American baseball player, heart attack.

10
Georges Cravenne, 94, French publicity agent, founder of the César Award.
Peter Kollock, 49, American sociologist, motorcycle accident.
Pio Laghi, 86, Italian Cardinal for San Pietro in Vincoli, Vatican Ambassador to the US (1980–1990), hematologic disease.
Liliana Lozano, 30, Colombian actress and beauty queen, shot.
Gil Mains, 79, American football player.
Jean Pelletier, 73, Canadian politician, Mayor of Quebec City (1977–1989), Chief of Staff (1993–2001), complications of colon cancer.
Eluned Phillips, 94, British writer, crowned bard at the National Eisteddfod of Wales (1967, 1983), pneumonia.
Colin Phipps, 74, British petroleum geologist and MP (1974–1979).
Ivor Spencer, 84, British toastmaster.
Bill Stone, 108, British World War I veteran.
Coosje van Bruggen, 66, Dutch-born American sculptor, wife of Claes Oldenburg, breast cancer.
Jack Wheeler, 89, British footballer.
Sidney Wood, 97, American tennis player, Hall of Fame (1964), third-youngest winner of Wimbledon (1931).
Ray Yoshida, 78, American painter, cancer.
Elżbieta Zawacka, 99, Polish World War II freedom fighter.

11
Maurice L. Albertson, 91, American Peace Corps architect, founder of Village Earth.
Quirino De Ascaniis, 100, Italian priest.
Anabel Bosch, 32, Filipino singer, cerebral aneurysm.
Andy DeMize, 25, American drummer (Nekromantix), car accident.
Shigeo Fukuda, 76, Japanese sculptor and graphic artist, subarachnoid hemorrhage.
Jack Gifford, 68, American businessman (Maxim Integrated Products), heart attack.
Epeli Hauʻofa, 70, Fijian writer and anthropologist, after short illness.
Bert Hazell, 101, British politician and trade unionist, MP (1964–1970), oldest modern MP.
Bob Kilby, 64, British motorcycle speedway rider, cancer.
Pat Lindsey, 72, American politician, member of the Alabama Senate (1967–1974, since 1982), heart attack.
Freddie Mack, 74, British boxer and musician.
Ricardo Martínez de Hoyos, 90, Mexican painter, pneumonia.
François de Noailles, 103, French noble.
Tom O'Horgan, 84, American theater director (Hair, Jesus Christ Superstar), complications of Alzheimer's disease.
Wally Olds, 59, American Olympic ice hockey silver medal-winning player (1972), colon cancer.
Frederic M. Richards, 83, American biochemist, natural causes.
Vivian Ridler, 95, British printer.
Lorene Rogers, 94, American educator, President of the University of Texas at Austin (1974–1979).
Milan Rúfus, 80, Slovak poet and academic.
Daryl Seaman, 86, Canadian businessman, co-owner of the Calgary Flames.
Jon Tvedt, 42, Norwegian orienteer and mountain runner, fall.
Victor Vacquier, 101, American geophysicist, pneumonia.
David Vine, 74, British sports presenter, heart attack.
Olle Wänlund, 85, Swedish Olympic cyclist.

12
Claude Berri, 74, French film director (Jean de Florette, Manon des Sources), Academy Award winner, stroke.
Russ Craft, 89, American football player (Philadelphia Eagles, Pittsburgh Steelers).
Friaça, 84, Brazilian footballer, multiple organ failure.
Walter Harris, 77, Canadian artist.
Mick Imlah, 52, British poet, motor neurone disease.
David Kerr, 86, British politician, MP for Wandsworth Central (1964–1970).
Arne Næss, 96, Norwegian philosopher, founder of deep ecology.
Michael Russell, 88, Irish Roman Catholic prelate, Bishop of Waterford and Lismore.
Alejandro Sokol, 48, Argentine rock and roll musician, cardio-respiratory failure.
Allen Zwerdling, 86, American theatre director and actor.

13
Ayman Alkurd, 34, Palestinian footballer, airstrike.
Pedro Aguilar, 81, American dancer, heart failure.
Hortense Calisher, 97, American author.
Tommy Casey, 78, British footballer.
Cousin Junior, 48, American professional wrestler, heart attack.
Mikhail Donskoy, 61, Russian programmer, co-developer of the first world computer chess champion (Kaissa).
John Edmondson, 2nd Baron Sandford, 88, British naval officer, politician, and Anglican priest.
Mary Ejercito, 103, Filipino mother of Joseph Estrada, heart seizure and stomach aneurysm.
Preston Gómez, 85, Cuban-born American baseball player, coach and manager (San Diego Padres).
Umar Israilov, 27, Russian critic of Chechen President Ramzan Kadyrov, shot.
Jean Keene, 85, American bird feeder, natural causes.
Gary Kurfirst, 61, American music manager.
Sir Dai Llewellyn, 62, British socialite, bone cancer.
Patrick McGoohan, 80, American-born Irish actor (The Prisoner, Braveheart, Escape from Alcatraz), after short illness.
Elizabeth Paterson-Brown, 87, Scottish curler.
James B. Pearson, 88, American politician, U.S. Senator from Kansas (1962–1978).
Mansour Rahbani, 83, Lebanese composer and musician, pneumonia.
Nicholas Andrew Rey, 70, Polish-born American diplomat, Ambassador to Poland (1993–1997), lung cancer.
W. D. Snodgrass, 83, American poet, lung cancer.
Folke Sundquist, 83, Swedish actor.
Richard Tyler, 92, British architect.
Eben van Zijl, 77, Namibian politician.
Nancy Bird Walton, 93, Australian aviator, natural causes.
Peter Ward, 95, British Olympic athlete.

14
Trammell Crow, 94, American real estate developer.
Mike Derrick, 65, American baseball player (Boston Red Sox).
Dušan Džamonja, 80, Croatian sculptor, heart failure.
Peter E. Fleming Jr., 79, American criminal defense lawyer, complications from lung surgery.
Jan Kaplický, 71, Czech-born British architect.
The Mighty Duke, 77, Trinidadian calypsonian, myelofibrosis.
Ricardo Montalbán, 88, Mexican-born American actor (Fantasy Island, Star Trek II: The Wrath of Khan, The Naked Gun), Emmy winner (1978), heart failure.
Angela Morley, 84, British composer and conductor.
Aron Moscona, 87, Israeli-born American biologist, heart failure.
Leo Rwabwogo, 59, Ugandan boxer, Olympic medallist (1968, 1972).
Gennadiy Shatkov, 76, Russian Soviet-era boxer, Olympic gold medalist (1956).

15
Abdirahman Ahmed, Somali politician, shot.
Boris Apostolov, 83, Bulgarian Olympic footballer.
Ovini Bokini, 64, Fijian chief and politician.
Maurice Chappaz, 92, Swiss author and poet.
Olivier Clement, 87, French Eastern Orthodox theologian.
William Close, 84, American physician, helped stem 2007 Congo ebola epidemic, father of Glenn Close, heart attack.
Veronika Dudarova, 92, Russian symphony conductor.
Tommy Jones, 54, American baseball player, manager and coach, brain cancer.
Tommy Muñiz, 86, Puerto Rican television producer and comedian, after long illness.
Said Seyam, 50, Palestinian government official, Interior Minister (2006–2007), airstrike.
Tapan Sinha, 84, Indian film director, bronchopneumonia.
Craig Stimac, 54, American baseball player (San Diego Padres), suicide.
Lillian Willoughby, 93, American Quaker activist, founder of Take Back the Night.

16
Aad Bak, 82, Dutch football player.
Sidney Brichto, 72, American-born British Liberal rabbi.
Jim Carvin, 79, American political strategist, heart failure.
Joe Erskine, 78, American boxer and ultramarathon runner.
Judith Hoffberg, 74, American art librarian and archivist, lymphoma.
Claudio Milar, 34, Uruguayan footballer, bus crash.
Gordon Whitey Mitchell, 76, American jazz musician and comedy writer (Get Smart, All in the Family, The Jeffersons), cancer.
Sir John Mortimer, 85, British barrister, novelist and dramatist (Rumpole of the Bailey), after long illness.
Robert Palmer, 74, American vintner, blood infection.
Bogdan Tirnanić, 67, Serbian journalist.
Joop Wille, 88, Dutch footballer (EDO and The Netherlands).
Andrew Wyeth, 91, American painter (Christina's World), after short illness.

17
Tomislav Crnković, 79, Croatian footballer.
Susanna Foster, 84, American actress and singer (Phantom of the Opera).
Gary Hill, 67, American basketball player.
Anders Isaksson, 65, Swedish writer, reporter and historian.
Mary Lundby, 60, American politician, member of the Iowa Senate since 1995, cervical cancer.
Malcolm MacPherson, 65, American journalist, heart attack.
Paul Nicholls, 62, Australian first-class cricketer, cancer.
Marjorie Parker Smith, 92, American figure skater.
Mike Parkinson, 60, New Zealand rugby union player.
Edmund Leopold de Rothschild, 93, British financier and horticulturist.
Arthur Weisberg, 77, American bassoonist, pancreatic cancer.
Kamil Zvelebil, 80, Czech scholar of Indian literature and linguistics, cancer.

18
Max Borges Jr., 90, Cuban architect.
Kathleen Byron, 88, British actress (Black Narcissus, The Elephant Man, Saving Private Ryan).
Holly Coors, 88, American conservative political activist and philanthropist, after long illness.
Tony Hart, 83, British artist and television presenter.
Nora Kovach, 77, Hungarian-born American ballerina, after short illness.
Bob May, 69, American actor (Lost in Space, The Time Tunnel), heart failure.
Zenonas Petrauskas, 58, Lithuanian lawyer and politician.
Bal Samant, 85, Indian writer, after long illness.
Seymour Schwartzman, 79, American cantor and operatic baritone.
James E. Swett, 88, American fighter pilot, Medal of Honor recipient, after long illness.
Grigore Vieru, 73, Moldovan poet, car accident.

19
Anastasia Baburova, 25, Russian journalist, shot.
E. Balanandan, 84, Indian politician and trade unionist, lung cancer.
Hugh Lindsay, 81, British Roman Catholic prelate, Bishop of Hexham and Newcastle.
Stanislav Markelov, 34, Russian civil rights lawyer, shot.
Dennis Page, 89, British Anglican prelate, Bishop of Lancaster (1975–1985).
Viking Palm, 85, Swedish Olympic gold medal-winning (1952) wrestler.
Raymond Parker, 89, British sprint canoer.
Luigi Preti, 94, Italian politician, natural causes.
José Torres, 72, Puerto Rican boxer, Olympic silver medallist (1956), heart attack.

20
Chris Chianelli, 58, American hobbyist, writer and television host, natural causes.
Constance E. Cook, 89, American politician, member of the New York State Assembly (1963–1974).
Austin Denney, 65, American football player (Chicago Bears, Buffalo Bills).
Johnny Dixon, 85, British footballer (Aston Villa), complications from Alzheimer's disease.
David S. Dodge, 86, American President of American University of Beirut (1996–1997), cancer.
Joe Domnanovich, 89, American football player.
Mark Fernando, 67, Sri Lankan judge, member of the Supreme Court of Sri Lanka, cancer.
Mickey Gee, 64, British rock and roll guitarist, emphysema.
Stéphanos II Ghattas, 89, Egyptian Coptic Catholic prelate, Patriarch of Alexandria (1986–2006).
Stan Hagen, 68, Canadian politician, member of the Legislative Assembly of British Columbia (1986–1991, since 2001), heart attack.
Dante Lavelli, 85, American football player (Cleveland Browns), Hall of Famer (1975), heart failure.
David "Fathead" Newman, 75, American jazz saxophonist (Fathead), pancreatic cancer.
Dina Vierny, 89, Russian-born French model.
Sheila Walsh, 80, British romantic novelist.
Leonard Albert Wiseman, 93,  British chemist and scientific administrator.

21
Irina Belotelkin, 96, Russian-born American couturier.
Ernie Bourne, 82, Australian actor.
Pat Crawford, 75, Australian Test cricketer, after long illness.
Vic Crowe, 76, British footballer (Aston Villa, Peterborough) and manager (Aston Villa, Portland Timbers), after long illness.
Shane Dronett, 38, American football player (Atlanta Falcons), suicide.
Astrid Folstad, 76, Norwegian actress.
Jean Jadot, 99, Belgian prelate and diplomat, Vatican Ambassador to the US (1974–1980), after long illness.
Leonard Kemp, 99, Australian cricketer.
Finn Kobberø, 73, Danish badminton player.
Horace R. Kornegay, 84, American politician, member of the U.S. House of Representatives from North Carolina (1961–1969).
Krista Kilvet, 62, Estonian journalist, politician and diplomat.
Sally Ledger, 47, English literary scholar.
Kunal Mitra, 44, Indian actor, heart attack.
Peter Persidis, 61, Austrian footballer, cancer.
Veatrice Rice, 59, American television personality (Jimmy Kimmel Live!), cancer.
Daphne Rooke, 94, South African author.
Charles H. Schneer, 88, American film producer (Jason and the Argonauts), Alzheimer's disease.

22
Panapasa Balekana, 79, Fijian-born Solomon Island co-writer of the Solomon Islands national anthem.
John Alan Beesley, 81, Canadian diplomat.
Chau Sen Cocsal Chhum, 103, Cambodian politician, Prime Minister (1962).
Bob Doyle, 93, Irish activist, last surviving Irish member of the International Brigade in the Spanish Civil War.
Bill Herchman, 75, American football player.
Sveinn Ingvarsson, 94, Icelandic Olympic sprinter.
Pentti Kouri, 59, Finnish economist and investor, after long illness.
Liang Yusheng, 85, Chinese novelist, natural causes.
Reginald Perkins, 53, American serial killer, execution by lethal injection.
Clément Pinault, 23, French footballer, heart attack.
Darrell Sandeen, 73, American actor (L.A. Confidential), stroke.
Louis-Paul-Armand Simonneaux, 93, French Bishop of Versailles.
Billy Werber, 100, American baseball player, last living teammate of Babe Ruth, oldest living Major League Baseball player, natural causes.
Mbongeleni Zondi, 39, South African Zulu chief, shot.

23
Ilija Arnautović, 84, Yugoslavian architect.
Sir Richard Beaumont, 96, British diplomat.
H. J. Blackham, 105, British humanist and writer.
Martin Delaney, 63, American HIV activist, complications from liver cancer.
Irving Feiner, 84, American freedom of speech advocate, ruptured cerebral aneurysm.
Helen Maksagak, 77, Canadian politician, first Inuk Northwest Territories Commissioner (1995–1999) and Nunavut (1999–2000).
Sybil Moses, 69, American judge (New Jersey Superior Court) and lawyer, breast cancer.
George Perle, 93, American composer, after long illness.
Anna Radziwiłł, 69, Polish historian and politician.
Robert W. Scott, 79, American politician, Governor of North Carolina (1969–1973), natural causes.
Percy Smith, 86, Canadian politician, MP for Northumberland—Miramichi (1968–1974).
Thomas, 61, American activist, pulmonary disease.
Compton Vyfhuis, 76, Guyanese West Indian cricket umpire.

24
Susan Baird, 68, Scottish politician, Lord Provost of Glasgow (1988–1992).
Gérard Blanc, 61, French singer and guitarist, cerebral hemorrhage.
Fernando Cornejo, 39, Chilean footballer, stomach cancer.
Mariana Bridi Costa, 20, Brazilian model, complications from necrotic sepsis.
Olivia Irvine Dodge, 90, American philanthropist.
Leonard Gaskin, 88, American jazz bassist.
Marie Glory, 103, French actress.
Reg Gutteridge, 84, British boxing commentator and journalist, stroke.
Diane Holland, 78, British actress, bronchial pneumonia.
Karl Koller, 79, Austrian footballer, Alzheimer's disease.
Len Perme, 91, American baseball player.
Olga Raggio, 82, Italian-born American art scholar and curator, cancer.
William Smith, 69, American theologian.
Thomas Ambrose Tschoepe, 93, American Bishop of Dallas.
Kay Yow, 66, American women's basketball coach (NC State), breast cancer.
Bernard C. Webber, 80, United States Coast Guardsman, heart attack.

25
Mamadou Dia, 98, Senegalese politician, Prime Minister (1957–1962).
León Klenicki, 78, American rabbi, colorectal cancer.
Ewald Kooiman, 70, Dutch organist, cardiac arrest.
Ed Lyons, 85, American baseball player (Washington Senators).
Kim Manners, 58, American television producer and director (The X-Files, Supernatural, 21 Jump Street), lung cancer.
John Murray, 93, Australian politician, MP (1958–1961).
Hiroshi Oguchi, 58, Japanese artist and musician.
Antonio Pagán, 50, American politician, New York City Councilman (1992–1998), Commissioner of Employment (1998–2002).
Marguerite, Baroness de Reuter, 96, British aristocrat, last heir of the Reuters family, granddaughter-in-law of Paul Reuter.

26
Mamman Bello Ali, 50, Nigerian politician, Senator (1999–2007), Governor of Yobe State since 2007, leukemia.
Fernando Amaral, 84, Portuguese politician, President of the Assembly of the Republic (1984–1987).
James Brady, 80, American columnist (Parade, New York Post).
Ahmad Hasan Dani, 88, Pakistani archaeologist.
John Isaacs, 93, American basketball player (New York Renaissance), stroke.
Ivan Jensen, 86, Danish footballer.
Roy Johnson, 49, American baseball player, heart attack.
Zakan Jugelia, Abkhaz politician, shot.
Don Ladner, 60, New Zealand rugby league player, heart attack.
Sir Donald Luddington, 88, British High Commissioner for Western Pacific (1973–1976), Hong Kong ICAC Commissioner (1978–1980).
Gerry Merito, 70, New Zealand singer and guitarist.
Avraham Ravitz, 75, Israeli politician, member of the Knesset (1988–2009), heart failure.
David Sabiston, 84, American physician, pioneer of heart surgery, stroke.
Alan Scott, 72, Australian oven manufacturer, heart failure.

27
Connie Buckley, 93, Irish hurler.
Christian Enzensberger, 77, German anglicist, author and translator.
Koji Kakizawa, 75, Japanese politician, Minister for Foreign Affairs (1994), esophageal cancer.
Blair Lent, 79, American author and illustrator (Tikki Tikki Tembo), pneumonia.
Michael Majerus, 54, British geneticist.
Aubrey Powell, 90, British footballer.
Mino Reitano, 64, Italian singer, after long illness.
Sharat Sardana, 40, British screenwriter (Goodness Gracious Me), streptococcal infection.
John Updike, 76, American author (Rabbit Is Rich, The Witches of Eastwick), lung cancer.
R. Venkataraman, 98, Indian politician, President (1987–1992), multiple organ failure.
Billy Wilson, 81, American football player (San Francisco 49ers), cancer.

28
Robert S. Barton, 83, American computer engineer.
Gene Corbett, 95, American baseball player (Philadelphia Phillies).
Glenn Davis, 74, American Olympic gold medal hurdler, after long illness.
John Patrick Diggins, 73, American historian, colorectal cancer.
Fang Chengguo, 65, Chinese banker.
Lucille M. Mair, 84, Jamaican diplomat.
Vasilij Melik, 88, Slovenian historian.
Gyula Pálóczi, 46, Hungarian athlete, heart disease.
Billy Powell, 56, American musician (Lynyrd Skynyrd), heart attack.
Mira Rostova, 99, Russian-born American acting coach.
Peter Serry, 35, Kenyan football player, coach and administrator, fire.
Robert L. Stone, 87, American CEO of The Hertz Corporation, heart failure.
Angel Wainaina, 25, Kenyan actress, fire.
Wendell Wyatt, 91, American politician, member of the United States House of Representatives for Oregon (1964–1975).

29
A. M. B. H. G. Abeyrathnebanda, 19, Sri Lankan soldier, explosion.
Pawlu Aquilina, 79, Maltese poet and writer.
René Berger, 93, Swiss writer, philosopher and art historian.
Juan Brotto, 69, Argentine Olympic cyclist.
Geraldine Bureker, 84, American baseball player (AAGPBL)
Charles Clews, 89, Maltese comedian.
Hank Crawford, 74, American jazz, rhythm and blues saxophonist, complications from a stroke.
John Harry Dunning, 81, British economist.
Bill Frindall, 69, British cricket statistician, Legionnaire's disease.
Karl Gass, 91, German documentary filmmaker, natural causes.
Hélio Gracie, 95, Brazilian martial artist, creator of Brazilian Jiu-Jitsu.
George Holmes, 81, British historian.
John Martyn, 60, British singer and songwriter, pneumonia.
Roger Pontet, 88, French cyclist.
Roy Saunders, 78, British footballer (Liverpool, Swansea City).
Charles H. Smelser, 88, American politician, Maryland Delegate (1955–1963) and State Senator (1967–1995).
Roy Somlyo, 83, American theatre producer, cancer.
François Villiers, 88, French film director.

30
José de Almeida Batista Pereira, 91, Brazilian Bishop of Guaxupé (1964–1976).
Hans Beck, 79, German inventor, creator of Playmobil toys.
Mike Francis, 47, Italian pop musician, lung cancer.
John Gordy, 73, American football player (Detroit Lions), pancreatic cancer.
H. Guy Hunt, 75, American politician, Governor of Alabama (1987–1993), lung cancer.
Safar Iranpak, 61, Iranian footballer, lung cancer.
Ingemar Johansson, 76, Swedish world heavyweight boxing champion (1959–1960), complications from pneumonia.
Sune Jonsson, 78, Swedish photographer and writer.
Gérard Lecointe, 96, French general.
Teddy Mayer, 73, American motor racing entrepreneur.
Milton Parker, 90, American businessman, owner of the Carnegie Deli, respiratory problems.
James Schevill, 88, American poet and playwright, stroke.
Stephen Zetterberg, 92, American attorney and politician.
Neiliezhü Üsou, 67, Indian influential Baptist preacher and public leader from the North-Eastern state of India, Nagaland.

31
Lino Aldani, 82, Italian science fiction writer, lung disease.
Sir John Fuller, 91, Australian politician and monarchist, member of New South Wales Legislative Council (1961–1978), cancer.
Harry Hill, 92, British bronze medal-winning Olympic cyclist (1936), pneumonia.
Thérèse Lavoie-Roux, 80, Canadian politician, after long illness.
Eddie Logan, 98, American Negro league baseball player, stroke.
Dewey Martin, 68, Canadian-born American drummer (Buffalo Springfield).
Nagesh, 75, Indian film comedian, after short illness.
Des Newton, 67, British craftsman, maker of model ships in bottles.
Clint Ritchie, 70, American actor (One Life to Live), blood clot after heart surgery.
Daniel Seligman, 84, American columnist (Fortune), multiple myeloma.
Erland von Koch, 98, Swedish composer.
Joanna Wiszniewicz, 61, Polish historian.

References

2009-01
 01